Governance without government is a form of governance which uses non-governmental means of government. It is a paradigm opposing  modern democracy. Modern democracy uses democratic procedures and institutions, including legislation and communicative rationality, whereas governance without government uses  laws of nature instead of legislation, and one-way communication instead of dialogue.

Governance without government relates to managed democracy, and to inverted totalitarianism, dismantling public institutions and giving  power to institutions where  democratic claims are not valid, e.g. big corporations and  secret societies.

Studies in governance without government

Michael Hardt and Antonio Negri 

Michael Hardt and Antonio Negri describe governance without government as the method of governing an empire, by which they mean the current world-system based on Friedmanite economics and military power. Thus governance without government uses governmental agencies to promote itself.

Georg Simmel 

Georg Simmel uses German concept "Form des Beharrens" meaning the idea of governance without government, in connection to monetarist idea of economic exchange in fixed-monetary-base regime.

Pierre Bourdieu 

Pierre Bourdieu sees independent i.e. Friedmanite central banks as the key powerholders, connecting them to Chicago economics, and Chicago economics to one-way communication, economists being not willing to discuss and keen to explain.

Hans-Peter Martin and Harald Schumann 

Hans-Peter Martin and Harald Schumann describe year 1989 as the end of the modern era and beginning of the non-democratic regimes around the world attacking against the welfare of the majority of people.

Naomi Klein 

Naomi Klein describes year 1989 as the beginning of Washington consensus and the policy of denying all discussion about alternative economic policies.

Larry Catá Backer 

Larry Catá Backer describes the organization of economics within multinational enterprise and in global production chains as the basis for governance that in some respects displaces the traditional organization of politics in government within states.

See also 

 Biopolitics
 Nudge theory
 Negarchy
 Post-modern
 Chicago economics
 Regulatory agency
 Polycentric law

References

Governance